Pareutropius buffei, the three-striped African catfish, is a species of fish in the family Schilbeidae, the schilbid catfishes.

Description
The body is silvery, with three lateral stripes, and there are black spots on the upper and lower parts of the rounded caudal fin. This species is sometimes kept as an aquarium pet.

Distribution and habitat
It is native to Nigeria, Niger, Mali, Benin and Guinea, where it inhabits rivers and freshwater lagoons.

References

Schilbeidae
Fish described in 1961